The KIV-7 is a National Security Agency Type-1, single-channel encryptor originally designed in the mid-1990s by AlliedSignal Corporation to meet the demand for secure data communications from personal computers (PC), workstations, and FAXs. It has data rates up to 512 kbit/s and is interoperable with the KG-84, KG-84A, and KG-84C data encryption devices.

Versions
Several versions of the KIV-7 have been developed over the years by many different corporations that have either bought the rights to build the KIV-7 or through corporate mergers.

KIV-7 		Speeds up to 512 kbit/s
KIV-7 HS	Speeds up to T-1 (1.54 Mbit/s)
KIV-7HSB	Speeds up to 2.048 Mbit/s
KIV-7M		Speeds up to 50 Mbit/s and supports the High Assurance Internet Protocol Interoperability Specification (HAIPIS)
 
(The National Security Agency (NSA) has established new High Assurance Internet Protocol Interoperability Specifications (HAIPIS) that requires different vendor's Inline Network Encryption (INE) devices to be interoperable.)

References
 HAIPE
 Committee on National Security Systems (CNSS Policy No. 19)
 Cryptography
 NSA encryption systems
 SafeNet Mykotronx, manufacturer of a line of KIV-7 devices.

External links
 CNSS Policy No. 19, National Policy Governing the Use of High Assurance Internet Protocol Encryptor (HAIPE) Products

Encryption devices
National Security Agency encryption devices
United States government secrecy